Eramalloor is a village in Alappuzha district in the Indian state of Kerala.

Demographics
 India census, Eramalloor had a population of 28223 with 14187 males and 14036 females.

Geography
Eramalloor is a place in Ezhupunna village located on the NH66 Highway linking Kanyakumari,Trivandrum, Mangloore, Goa, Panvel(Mumbai). It is near the coast, with a landscape characterised by salty ponds (known locally as "Kandom") and larger ponds used for fishing (known as "Chaal"). It lies along the backwaters of Alapuzha, and is situated next to Ezhupunna near  the model tourism village at Kumbalangi and the beach at Chellanam.

Administration
Administratively, Eramalloor falls under the Ezhupunna panchayat (local village administrative body) of the Alapuzha District.

Industry and economy
The village is famous for sea food processing industries, such as Torry Harris, Premier, AFDC and Diamond Seafoods. Agriculture has declined in the past years, with the paddy fields giving way for shrimp cultivation or to be reclaimed for housing.

Educational Institutions
 NSLP (Kattisseri) School
 ECEK Union, Chammanad
 Santa Cruz Public School

Places Of Worship
 Thottappalli Sreekrishna Temple
 Paingakulam Sree Partha Sarathi Temple
 Konanadu Devi Temple
 Subramania swamy temple
 Sree Dharma Shastha Temple, Chammanadu
 Kannukullangara Temple
 Kanjirathinkal Sree Khandakarna Devi Temple
 Chammanad Devi Temple
 Kizhakke Chammanad Devi Temple
 Sree krishna temple Sreenarayanapuram
 Saraswathi Temple
 baalasubramanya swamy temple 
 St. Jude Church 
 St. Joseph Church
 St. Francis Xavier's Church
 Masjid Rifai

See also
 Kakkathuruth

References

Villages in Alappuzha district